Survivor Japan: Philippines, was the third season of Survivor Japan and it aired from October 15, 2002 to December 17, 2002. This season was set in Siquijor, Philippines. As a new rule, contestants could win rewards without having to compete in reward challenges against the other tribe. In these challenges, each tribe could obtain rewards when they achieved a certain goal. Beginning with this season, each player could bring one luxury item. These items things couldn't be used as tools to survive on the island.
Prior to the tribe merge, both tribes had to burn their camp down, and to move to the specified new island. Also beginning with this season the number of jury members increased from six to seven. Ultimately, it was construction worker Yasuhito Ebisawa, who won the season by a vote of 4-3 over bar owner Sei Sugawara. Following his victory, Ebisawa went on to become an actor in Japan.

Finishing order

Voting history

 As Izumi and Yukio both received two votes at the twelfth tribal council, the number of votes each had received at previous tribal councils was taken into account. Izumi had 2 previous votes but Yukio had 3, therefore Yukio was eliminated.

External links
https://web.archive.org/web/20040806043300/http://www.tbs.co.jp/survivor/3/index-j.html
http://www.h4.dion.ne.jp/~seiya-mu/survivor/survivor3.ja.episode.html

Japan
Japanese game shows
Television shows filmed in the Philippines